367943 Duende (provisional designation ) is a micro-asteroid and a near-Earth object of the Aten and Atira group, approximately  in diameter. It was discovered by astronomers of the Astronomical Observatory of Mallorca at its robotic La Sagra Observatory in 2012, and named for the duende, a goblin-like creature from Iberian and Filipino mythology and folklore. Duende is likely an uncommon L-type asteroid and significantly elongated. For an asteroid of its size, it has a relatively long rotation period of 9.485 hours.

Due to its close passage, its orbit was perturbed significantly enough that it changed from an Apollo asteroid to an Aten asteroid. Duende passage also coincided with the completely unrelated Chelyabinsk meteor, which entered Earth's atmosphere above Russia just 16 hours earlier.

Discovery and past risk assessments 

Duende was discovered on 23 February 2012, seven days after passing  from Earth, by the La Sagra Observatory in Granada Province, Spain, using a 0.45-m reflector which was remotely operated by amateur astronomers at the Astronomical Observatory of Mallorca.

The still relatively imprecise orbit deduced from the short arc of the 2012 observations already made clear that Duende would pass no closer to Earth's surface than 3.2 Earth radii during its 2013 passage. There was at the time, however, a cumulative risk of 0.033% (1 in 3,030) that Duende would impact Earth during one of its 2026 to 2069 approaches.

2013 passage

On 9 January 2013, Duende was observed again by Las Campanas Observatory and the observation arc immediately increased from 79 days to 321 days.

It briefly peaked at an apparent magnitude of roughly 7.2, a factor of a few fainter than would have been visible to the naked eye. The best observation location for the closest approach was Indonesia. Eastern Europe, Asia, and Australia also were well situated to observe Duende during its closest approach.

Duende was not expected to pass any closer than 1950 km to any satellites. Goldstone Observatory observed Duende with radar from February 16 to February 20.

During the close approach, an observational campaign involving 5 different telescopes in 4 different observatories was carried on in order to get information on the physical properties of this NEO.

Visible and near-Infrared photometry and visible spectroscopy were obtained at Gran Telescopio Canarias, Telescopio Nazionale Galileo and Calar Alto Observatory and put together. The classification using the M4AST online tool says this is an L-type asteroid. Those peculiar asteroids are characterized by a strongly reddish spectrum shortward of 0.8 μm, and a featureless flat spectrum longward of this, with little or no concave-up curvature related to a 1 μm silicon absorption band.
Time-series photometry was also obtained in the Observatorio de La Hita and Observatorio de Sierra Nevada during two consecutive nights (15–16 February 2013). All of this data were co-phased to build a lightcurve of the object. This lightcurve is double-peak and presents large variations in magnitude, implying a very elongated object, which is compatible with radar observations. The amplitude of the lightcurve yields an axial ratio that, together with the long axis of 40 m inferred from the radar images by Goldstone, results in an equivalent diameter of 18 m, much smaller than the estimations before the close-approach.

This value is confirmed with an analysis of all the photometry of this objects reported to the Minor Planet Center. Using data pre and post close approach the authors find that the object suffered a spin-up during the event that decreased the rotational period from  down to  hours, which is compatible with the more accurate value estimated from the light-curve.

Orbital shift 

The close approach to Earth reduced the orbital period of Duende from 368 days to 317 days, Its aphelion was reduced from 1.110 to 0.9917 AU, leaving it almost entirely inside Earth's orbit and perturbing it from the Apollo class to the Aten class of near-Earth asteroids.

For the 2123 passage, the nominal pass will be  from the center of the Moon and then  from the center of Earth.

Risks 

Risk assessments calculated before the 2013 passage were based on a diameter of 45 meters and a mass of 130,000 tonnes. The Tunguska event has been estimated at 3–20 megatons. Asteroids of approximately 50 meters in diameter are expected to impact Earth once every 1,200 years or so. Asteroids larger than 35 meters across can pose a threat to a town or city, and the Chelyabinsk meteor which serendipitously occurred on the day of the 2013 passage was due to a 17-meter asteroid. As a result of radar observations, it is now known that Duende is only about 30 meters in diameter.
 The uncertainty region of Duende during planetary encounters is now well determined through 2123.
 Duende was therefore removed from the Sentry Risk Table on 16 February 2013.
 It is estimated that there are more than a million near-Earth asteroids smaller than 100 meters.

The table above uses Sentry's stony asteroid density of 2600 kg/m3, Sentry's atmospheric entry velocity (Vimpact) of 12.7 km/s, and an angle of 45 degrees.

For kinetic energy at atmospheric entry, 3.3 Mt is equivalent to DF-4, 9 Mt is equivalent to Ivy Mike and 15.6 Mt is equivalent to Castle Bravo. For air burst energy, 530 kt is equivalent to W88 and 2.9 Mt is equivalent to R-12 Dvina.

Naming 

This minor planet was named after the duende, fairy- or goblin-like mythological creatures from Iberian, Latin American and Filipino folklore. The approved naming citation was published by the Minor Planet Center 17 November 2013 .

See also 
  
 2011 MD
 2013 PDC-E
 (29075) 1950 DA
 99942 Apophis
 
 Don Quijote (spacecraft)

Notes

References

External links 

  around the time of its minimum distance from the Earth (Virtual Telescope Project, 15 February 2013)
 Video: Fly by, 15 February 2013
 Asteroid  to Safely Pass Earth (JPLnews video, 4 February 2013)
 Guide to Asteroid  Super Close Approach (Bruce Betts, 4 February 2013, includes video)
  Earth Impact Risk Summary, nasa.gov
 Real-time video of asteroid  passing Earth (Clay Center Observatory, beginning 6 p.m. EST on 15 February 2013)
 No, asteroid  will not hit us next year, Bad Astronomy blog (Phil Plait, 4 March 2012)
 Cool animation showing asteroid DA 14′s near miss next year, Bad Astronomy blog (Phil Plait, 8 March 2012)
  sparks asteroid fever (Astro Bob, 6 March 2012)
 Near-miss asteroid will return next year (ESA 15 March 2012)
  orbit calculation with a 3 day observation arc (mpml : 26 February 2012)
 Meteoroid hazard to satellites comes overwhelmingly from the marbles, not the mountains (mpml : 26 March 2012)
 Table of next close approaches (Sormano Astronomical Observatory)
 SAEL – Small Asteroid Encounter List (Sormano Astronomical Observatory)
 
 
 

367943
367943
367943
Named minor planets
Near-Earth objects removed from the Sentry Risk Table
367943
367943
20130215
20120223